Murder on the Mississippi, fully titled as Murder on the Mississippi: The Adventures of Sir Charles Foxworth, is a 1986 detective adventure game developed and published by Activision for the Commodore 64, Commodore 128 and the Apple II computers, and licensed by Jaleco exclusively in Japan for the Famicom and MSX2 as . It is an adventure game in which the player must solve a murder mystery on the luxury ship "Delta Princess". The story is based loosely on the Agatha Christie novel Death on the Nile.

The game is particularly notable in Japan for being known as a kusoge (i.e. a terrible game).

Plot 
While heading to New Orleans from St. Louis on the ship "Delta Princess", detective Sir Charles and Watson are caught up in the midst of a murder case by chance, that they must solve.

Characters (passengers and crew) 

Not Holmes. Becomes the second victim. His appearance is similar to that of a painting of Sherlock Holmes by Charles Doyle (Arthur Conan Doyle's father).

Known as "Regis" in the Activision version. Only a few of his memos can be taken. He occasionally takes walks by himself without any notice. After Charles' death, he longs to do everything over again the right way.

A prostitute, staying in Room 8. Going to New Orleans to visit her Aunt Pearl. Her aunt's secret formula for Okra soup is popular among the passengers.

Prostitute from Nevada. Staying in Room 2F20.

Judge staying in Room 9. Has a reputation for drinking.

The widow of a millionaire, staying in Room 2F23. Has a very bad reputation amongst the passengers.

The captain. Speaks of the incident even before entering the cabin and discovering the body.

Philanthropist staying in Room 2F15. His hobby is shooting, and he often hits birds.

Crew member staying in Room 1F27. Brown's illegitimate son. Is in love with Taylor.

The victim, found dead in Room 4. Owner of the Delta Princess, which he co-manages with Nelson. Also managed many additional businesses.

Gameplay

Trap 
Pitfalls exist in Room 1 and Room 14. Falling through one of these holes results in death and an instant game over. There is also a trap in Room 16, in which a knife flies through the air towards Sir Charles immediately after he enters. Unless the knife is dodged it hits Sir Charles in the head and kills him, resulting in another instant game over. While solving the case reveals the true criminal, the identity of the person that set these traps remains a mystery.

Re-interviewing characters 
Each suspect can only be spoken to once per piece of new information— consequently, if there is a piece of information missed the first time around, since it is impossible to talk to them again this can lead to the player becoming impossibly stuck in the game and unable to progress any further.

Reception 
Compute! called Murder on the Mississippi "a rich, enjoyable adventure game".

Reasons cited include that the lack of a save feature, necessitating that the game be replayed from the beginning every session; the instant-death traps being unreasonable; the specific order of steps being required to complete the game being unreasonably particular; re-interviewing characters being impossible despite the information they offer changing based on ostensibly illogical requirements; and adult themes and language being used despite the Famicom's young audience.

Notes

See also 
 Portal

References

External links
 
 Murder on the Mississippi (Commodore 64 version) at c64sets.com

1986 video games
Apple II games
Activision games
Adventure games
Commodore 64 games
Detective video games
Jaleco games
MSX2 games
Nintendo Entertainment System games
Tose (company) games
Video games scored by Ed Bogas
Video games set in the United States
Video games developed in the United States
Single-player video games